The 2010 West Virginia Mountaineer football team represented West Virginia University in the college football season of 2010. The Mountaineers were led by head coach Bill Stewart and played their home games on Mountaineer Field at Milan Puskar Stadium in Morgantown, West Virginia. They were members of the Big East Conference. They finished the season 9–4, 5–2 in Big East play to share the conference title with Connecticut and Pittsburgh (UConn earned the conference's BCS berth via a tiebreaker). They were invited to the Champ Sports Bowl where they were defeated by North Carolina State 7–23.

Schedule

Rankings

Game summaries

Coastal Carolina

Marshall

Facing a 21–6 fourth-quarter deficit, West Virginia outscored Marshall 15–0 on drives of 96 and 98 yards in the final 8:28 of the game. In overtime WVU took the lead with a field goal and won 24–21 when Marshall's kicker Tyler Warner missed a 39-yard field goal attempt. The comeback win was significant because the loss would have marked Marshall's first-ever win in the series.

Maryland

LSU

UNLV

South Florida

Syracuse

WVU lost their homecoming game to Syracuse after winning eight straight in the series. The loss, which saw Geno Smith throw three interceptions (after throwing only two all season), broke the Mountaineers' 12-game home winning streak and dropped the team out of the BCS standings. Coming into the game, West Virginia was the only ranked team in the Big East.

Connecticut

West Virginia lost to Connecticut for the first time in history after WVU's Ryan Clarke fumbled at the UConn one yard line and Connecticut's Dave Teggart kicked the game-winning, 27-yard field goal in overtime.  After the loss, the WVU coaching staff received criticism from fans and the media over the team's offensive struggles in two consecutive Big East conference games against Syracuse and the Huskies.

Cincinnati

After losing two consecutive conference games, the Mountaineers needed to win against the Bearcats to stay in the Big East race.  The Mountaineers snapped a two-game losing skid against Cincinnati by getting off to a quick start behind Geno Smith's four first-half touchdown passes.

Louisville

The Mountaineers stayed in contention for the Big East title by winning 17–10 on the road in a contest highlighted by defensive performances. The West Virginia defense, at the time ranked 4th in the country and first in the Big East Conference, held the Big East's best rushing team (averaging 192 yards per game) to a total of 26 yards on the ground. The defense allowed only 3 offensive points—the other 7 coming off a Louisville fumble recovery in the end zone—and held the Cardinals to 2 of 13 on 3rd-down conversions. However, the WVU offense failed to score a second-half touchdown for the fourth time in its five conference games. The Mountaineers also remained scoreless in the fourth quarter in Big East play.

Pittsburgh

In the 103rd edition of the Backyard Brawl, the Mountaineers remained in contention for the Big East's BCS Bowl bid by winning 35–10 at Heinz Field. Pittsburgh controlled its own destiny, and needed to win its last two games to claim the Big East title and BCS bowl berth outright, but the West Virginia defense forced 4 turnovers off of 6 Panther fumbles and an interception to defeat Pitt for the second year in a row. The West Virginia offense, plagued by poor performances in the second half of its previous Big East games, showed improvement by totaling 21 points in the second half and breaking its scoreless streak in the fourth quarter of conference games. The momentum heavily favored the Mountaineers after Geno Smith threw a 71-yard touchdown pass to Tavon Austin to make the score 21–7 in the third quarter. Following the win, the Mountaineers appeared in the top 25 rankings, listed 24 in the BCS and 23 in the AP, for the first time since their home loss to Syracuse over a month earlier.

Rutgers

Geno Smith threw for a career-high 352 yards, Ryan Clarke had three short touchdown runs, and No. 23 West Virginia overcame turnover problems to beat the Scarlet Knights 35–14 to clinch a share of the Big East title. It marked the fifth shared or outright Big East title for the Mountaineers since 2003. Smith finished the season with 2,567 passing yards and 22 TDs. Both are the second most in school history behind Marc Bulger's 3,607 yards and 31 TDs in 1998. WVU extended its winning streak over Rutgers to 15, and have never lost to the Scarlet Knights in Morgantown. After defeating Rutgers in the regular season finale, WVU needed a UCONN loss to obtain berth in a BCS bowl. The Huskies defeated South Florida later that evening, and despite winning a share of the Big East title, the Mountaineers lost the head-to-head tiebreaker with Connecticut, who received the conference's BCS bowl bid.

References

West Virginia
West Virginia Mountaineers football seasons
Big East Conference football champion seasons
West Virginia Mountaineers football